São Bernardo Futebol Clube, commonly referred to as São Bernardo, is a professional association football club based in São Bernardo do Campo, São Paulo, Brazil. The team will compete next season in Série C, the third tier of Brazilian football, as well as in the Campeonato Paulista Série A1, the top division of the São Paulo state football league. 

The club play their home games at the 12,504 capacity Estádio 1º de Maio. Supporters maintain rivalries with a number of fellow ABC Region clubs, including Santo André, São Caetano, Água Santa and crosstown rivals EC São Bernardo. The club's home colours are yellow and black and the team mascot is a tiger.

São Bernardo participated twice in the Copa do Brasil, their best result being a second stage exit in 2013. The club also took part in the Série D once, finishing 9th in the 2017 season. São Bernardo won the Campeonato Paulista Série A2 in 2012 and the Copa Paulista in 2013. The club's highest ever state league finish came in 2016 when they finished sixth in the Paulistão.

Founded in 2004, the club started in Campeonato Paulista Segunda Divisão in 2005, securing promotion to Série A3 by the end of the first year. In 2008, they were runners-up of Série A3 and were promoted to Campeonato Paulista Série A2. Following a fourth place finish in 2010, São Bernardo played in Série A1 for the first time in 2011, but stayed only one season in the top flight of the São Paulo state football league and were relegated back to Série A2. They returned to the state first division one year later and had a five-year stay in the Série A1 before being relegated at the end of the 2017 season.

History
Despite being the largest city in the ABC region in terms of population and the headquarters of some of the most successful volleyball and handball teams in the entire country, São Bernardo do Campo has never had a great football tradition, unlike the neighboring cities of São Caetano do Sul and Santo André, whose clubs had already emerged with great performances on national scale. As a result, representatives of the city's amateur football competition, the São Bernardo do Campo Football League, political authorities and retired local players started thinking about doing something for São Bernardo's football.

In 2004, a group of politicians headed by the city's former Sports Secretary and then federal deputy Edinho Montemor and state deputy Orlando Morando, along with five more people, founded São Bernardo Futebol Clube. on December 20, 2004, with an investment of BR$ 100,000. The team would also receive, on behalf of the city, a subsidy in the amount of BR$ 400,000, but the project was not approved by the City Council of São Bernardo do Campo. The team is, since its foundation, a club-company, having its CNPJ registered on January 5, 2005 under the name of São Bernardo Futebol Clube Ltda. The club was founded with the ambitious goal of reaching the elite of state football in five years.

Kit 
As of 2020, the club's kit has been manufactured by the club itself and sponsored by club owner brand, watchmaker company Magnum.

Current squad

Honours

Domestic

State 
 Campeonato Paulista Série A2:
Winners (2): 2012, 2021
 Campeonato Paulista Série A3:
 Runners-up (1): 2008
Copa Paulista:
Winners (2): 2013, 2021

Stadium
São Bernardo Futebol Clube play their home games at Estádio Primeiro de Maio. The stadium has a maximum capacity of 17,000 people.

References

 
Association football clubs established in 2004
Football clubs in São Paulo (state)
2004 establishments in Brazil